In the Heart of a Fool is a 1920 American silent drama film directed by Allan Dwan. It is based on a novel by William Allen White.

Plot
As described in a film magazine, in a small town lives Dr. Harvey Nesbit (Burton), who knows of the scandals of the community. His daughter Laura (Thurman) loves Grant Adams (Kirkwood), the editor of the local newspaper. Margaret Muller (Nilsson) arrives in town to teach at the school and takes lodging at Grant's mother's house. She desires to dethrone Laura as a social leader, and decides to use Grant to obtain her desire. Laura, to arouse Grant's jealousy, flirts with another man, and they quarrel. Laura returns to her boarding school, and when she returns after her term she discovers Margaret as the mother of Grant's illegitimate child. Grant's mother, to shield Margaret's reputation, assumes the parentage of the child. As Dr. Nesbit knows differently, this places a barrier between him and his daughter. Grant's mother dies and with Margaret, in pursuit of Henry Fenn (Crane), a young lawyer, refuses to mother her child. Fenn's partner Tom VanDorn (McCullough) marries Laura, and Fenn marries Margaret. Eventually Laura's husband succumbs to Margaret's wiles, their affair leading to the divorce of Fenn and Laura from the guilty couple. Grant quits his paper to become foreman at a coal mine. A terrific explosion happens and, while attempting to rescue his men, Grant is badly injured. He is taken to Dr. Nesbit's home and Laura, tired of VanDorn, arrives at the same time. She nurses him back to health and the fires of love are rekindled. They decide to work to better the condition of the miners, but the issue of Grant's parentage remains a barrier between them. A strike is called and "Hog Tight" Sands, the owner of the mine, engages a horde of strike breakers to run Grant out of town. In the melee VanDorn holds up Grant's little son as a threat to make Grant give himself up, and the child is shot. Margaret then hates VanDorn and kills him, and then goes insane. On the deathbed of the child Grant confesses to Laura that the child is his, admitting this was a barrier between them. They come to an understanding and happiness.

Cast 
 James Kirkwood Sr. as Grant Adams
 Anna Q. Nilsson as Margaret Muller
 Mary Thurman as Laura Nesbit
 Philo McCullough as Tom VanDorn
 Ward Crane as Henry Fenn
 John Burton as Dr. Harvey Nesbit
 Margaret Campbell as Mrs. Nesbit
 Percy Challenger as Daniel Sands
 Arthur Hoyt as Mortie Sands
 Harold Miller
 Claire Windsor

References

External links 

 
Lobby cards and stills at Claire Windsor weebly.com
Still with Mary Thurman at gettyimages.com
Still with Mary Thurman and James Kirkwood at silentfilmstillarchive.com

1920 films
1920s English-language films
Films directed by Allan Dwan
American silent feature films
American black-and-white films
Silent American drama films
1920 drama films
1920s American films